Stornarella is a town and comune in the province of Foggia in the Apulia region the southeast of Italy.

References

Cities and towns in Apulia